Mhasawad is a village in Jalgaon district of the Indian state of Maharashtra.

References

Villages in Jalgaon district